A Day with the Devil (Spanish: Un día con el Diablo) is a 1945 Mexican comedy film directed by Miguel M. Delgado and starring Cantinflas, Andrés Soler and Miguel Arenas.

Cast 
 Cantinflas as Juan Pérez
 Andrés Soler as El Diablo / El policía
 Miguel Arenas
 Susana Cora
 Lauro Benítez
 Roberto Corell
 Manuel Dondé
 Pedro Elviro
 Juan García
 Rafael Icardo
 Pepe Nava
 Óscar Pulido
 José Eduardo Pérez
 Salvador Quiroz
 Humberto Rodríguez 
 Ángel T. Sala
 Estanislao Schillinsky
 Hernán Vera as Nerón
 Roberto Cañedo

References

Bibliography 
 Stavans, Ilan. The Riddle of Cantinflas: Essays on Hispanic Popular Culture, Revised and Expanded Edition. UNM Press, 2012.

External links 
 

1945 films
1945 comedy films
Mexican comedy films
1940s Spanish-language films
Films directed by Miguel M. Delgado
Mexican black-and-white films
1940s Mexican films